Picture Gallery, more commonly known as Royal Parade, is an old solitaire game using two decks of playing cards. The object of the game is to move cards to the foundations to create a gallery full of picture or face cards.

Rules
Royal Parade has 24 foundations total. There are three rows with eight foundations each. The top row of foundations all start with twos, and build up in suit by threes, e.g. 2♣, 5♣, 8♣, J♣.

The next row's foundations all start with threes, and build up in suit by threes, e.g. 3♥, 6♥, 9♥, Q♥

The last row's foundations all start with fours, and build up in suit by threes, e.g. 4♠, 7♠, 10♠, K♠.

Underneath the 24 foundations are eight tableau piles, and no building is allowed. An Ace Pile or Castoff Pile is also present, due to the fact that there is no need for Aces in this game.  When new cards are needed, an entire row of eight cards is dealt from the stock to the tableau.

Seeing how there is no need for Aces in Royal Parade, all Aces are discarded to the Ace Pile (Castoff Pile). This will create some openings in the foundations, creating the availability to move cards around. Only twos can be placed onto the first row's openings, threes onto the second row's openings, and fours onto the last row's openings. The game is won after the foundations are completely filled with "Picture" cards (face cards).

Virginia Reel

Albert H. Morehead and Geoffrey Mott-Smith created Virginia Reel as an improvement on Royal Parade. Among other differences, in Virginia Reel a gap left behind in the gallery has to be filled before new cards can be dealt.

See also
 Virginia Reel
 List of solitaire games
 Glossary of solitaire terms

References

See also
 List of solitaires
 Glossary of solitaire

Double-deck patience card games
Mobile games
Open packers